Hollingbourne Downs is a  biological Site of Special Scientific Interest east of Maidstone in Kent.

This escarpment has unimproved chalk grassland and beech woodland. The dominant grasses are tor-grass, upright brome and sheep's fescue, and shrub species on woodland margins include the wayfaring-tree and traveller's-joy.

The site is crossed by several public footpaths.

References

Sites of Special Scientific Interest in Kent